Danger by Design is the 14th installment in the Nancy Drew point-and-click adventure game series by Her Interactive. The game is available for play on Microsoft Windows platforms. It has an ESRB rating of E for moments of mild violence and peril. Players take on the first-person view of fictional amateur sleuth Nancy Drew and must solve the mystery through interrogation of suspects, solving puzzles, and discovering clues. There are two levels of gameplay, Junior and Senior detective modes, each offering a different difficulty level of puzzles and hints, however neither of these changes affect the actual plot of the game. The game is loosely based on a book entitled Death by Design (1988).

Plot
Nancy Drew travels to Paris to work undercover as an assistant to Minette, an up-and-coming couture fashion designer. Minette hasn't quite been herself lately. She is never seen without wearing a mask, and she often throws temper tantrums and irrationally fires her employees. She is running dangerously behind schedule and her financial backers are concerned about her ability to complete her work. Has the stress of fame forced her behind that mask, or is there something sinister lurking in the shadows of her studio?

Development

Characters
Nancy Drew - Nancy is an 18-year-old amateur detective from the fictional town of River Heights in the United States. She is the only playable character in the game, which means the player must solve the mystery from her perspective.
Minette - Minette donned a mask at the end of her fall show and hasn't taken it off since. Lately, as her deadlines loom closer, she has been acting strangely, throwing temper tantrums and firing her employees. Minette is socially inept, high-strung, and temperamental, but above all, she is talented. Recently, Minette has been receiving threatening notes from an anonymous writer.
Heather McKay - Heather is Minette's friendly assistant, and she has lasted far longer than any of the assistants before her. She dreams of making it big in the fashion world but is staying on with Minette in hopes of gaining some contacts and experience. Heather has a major crush on Dieter, but he doesn't share her feelings.
Dieter von Schwesterkrank - Dieter is an enterprising, arrogant, and ambitious young photographer. He once dated Minette, but she broke it off, leaving him heartbroken and humiliated. Dieter tends to keep to himself and dislikes almost everyone else in the fashion industry. He obsessively searches for his great-uncle's long lost treasure.
Jing Jing Ling - Jing Jing, better known as JJ, is Minette's fitting model. Minette requires her to be a size 12, so she is constantly eating chocolate chip cookies. Although she is down-to-earth, bubbly, and outgoing, JJ is bitter after being tricked into signing her current contract with Minette, forcing her to stay in Paris much longer than she originally anticipated.
Jean Michel Traquenard - Jean Mi is a columnist for GlamGlam magazine and a critical voice when it comes to fashion. Most people are terrified that he will write something bad about them, so they bow and scrape in his presence. As far as Jean Mi is concerned, whatever he wants, he will get. He is well known for being conceited.

Cast
Nancy Drew - Lani Minella
Jing Jing Ling - Amy Broomhall
Heather McKay / Monique - Megan Hill
Minette / Malika - Shawnmarie Yates
Jean-Michel Traquenard - Guy Nelson
Dieter von Schwesterkrank / Zu / Ernst Schmeck - Stephen Hando
Lynn Manrique - Dana Cali
Hugo Butterly / Monsieur Marchand / Gunther Schmeck - Tim Moore
Prudence Rutherford - Simone Choule
Bess Marvin - Alisa Murray
George Fayne - Patty Pomplun
Frank Hardy - Jonah Von Spreekin
Joe Hardy - Rob Jones
Waiter / Police - Mathias Jangla

Reception
Charles Herold of The New York Times wrote, "The game itself is decent over all, though hardly the best in the series, but the ending is anticlimactic."

References

2006 video games
Detective video games
Video games based on Nancy Drew
Point-and-click adventure games
Video games developed in the United States
Video games scored by Kevin Manthei
Video games set in Paris
Windows games
Windows-only games
Her Interactive games
Video games with alternate endings
Single-player video games
North America-exclusive video games